Nemapogon signatella is a moth of the family Tineidae. It is found from Italy to the Balkan Peninsula and on Cyprus, as well as in Turkey, Jordan and Iran.

References

Moths described in 1957
Nemapogoninae